Tsagatuy (Sagaatai) is a rural locality (a selo) and the administrative centre of Tsagatuyskoye Rural Settlement, Dzhidinsky District, Republic of Buryatia, Russia. The population was 698 as of 2017. There are 6 streets.

Geography 
Tsagatuy is located 13 km north of Petropavlovka (the district's administrative centre) by road. Dede-Ichyotuy is the nearest rural locality.

References 

Rural localities in Dzhidinsky District